Anthracobia macrocystis is a species of apothecial fungus belonging to the family Pyronemataceae.

This is a European species which appears as orange discs up to 3 mm across thickly clustered on burnt ground.

References

Anthracobia macrocystis at Species Fungorum

Pyronemataceae
Fungi described in 1875
Taxa named by Mordecai Cubitt Cooke